Turcu is a Romanian surname. Notable people with the surname include:

Cristian Turcu (born 1976), Romanian footballer
Elisabeta Turcu, Romanian artistic gymnast
Lucian Turcu, Romanian footballer
Viorel Turcu, Romanian footballer

Romanian-language surnames